Fintan Ryan is an Irish comedy screenwriter, best known for writing the BBC Two sitcom Never Better and the E4 science fiction series The Aliens.

References

External links
Never Better on the BBC website
BFI biography

Television writers from Northern Ireland
Living people
Year of birth missing (living people)
Place of birth missing (living people)